Gosains, (गोसाईं) who are also known as Gossains and as Goswami, are Hindu ascetics of India. The term can be translated as master of passion. They are sometimes referred to more generally as Sannyasis.

The Gosains were powerful nomadic and mercenary trading groups who undertook pilgrimages across significant areas of land. While early British colonists in Bengal Presidency considered them to be marauding robbers, similar to the Banjaras, they were also important to urban economies and the development of wider trade networks. These itinerant religious mendicant groups could be very large in number, with figures in excess of 50,000 being probable for those headed by figures such as Umrao Giri and Himmat Bahadur in the late 1700s. Their numerical strength enabled them to be self-protecting and also to protect the trade routes that they used, regardless of who might have titular power in any given place. Their movements were often dictated by religious festivals, both of a localised village nature and of a more widely celebrated type, such as Holi. As these festivals were also occasions for seasonal markets, so the Gosains were able to move and trade goods between areas.

The Nawabs of Awadh, who ruled Oudh State in the 18th and 19th centuries and were Muslim successors to the Mughal empire, recruited from Gosain martial brotherhoods as a way to assimilate influential Hindu elements of society and buttress their own sources of power. This attempt at creating a plural society was in sharp contrast to the zealotry that had characterised their predecessors.

References 
Citations

Bibliography

Further reading 

Nomadic groups in Eurasia
Merchant castes
Mercenaries in India
Mercenary units and formations of the Middle Ages